Melvil Poupaud (born 26 January 1973) is a French actor, author and filmmaker.

Career
Poupaud's first appearance was, as a child, in Raúl Ruiz's 1983 film City of Pirates. He met Ruiz through his mother, Chantal Poupaud, who was a well-known press relations officer in the French film world.

He starred in François Ozon's Time to Leave, and co-starred with Parker Posey in Zoe Cassavetes' Broken English.

He also appeared in films such as Eric Rohmer's A Summer's Tale, Arnaud Desplechin's A Christmas Tale, and François Ozon's The Refuge.

He co-starred with Suzanne Clément in Xavier Dolan's Laurence Anyways.

Having led a selective career, grown in a family having close links with the cinema world, he has been close to figures of the Parisian intelligentsia during the seventies and eighties, such as Marguerite Duras or Jacques Lacan.

Personal life
Poupaud dated actress Chiara Mastroianni for four years from the age of 16 to 20. Though the two split up they remained friends and collaborators for decades with Mastroianni crediting Poupaud with encouraging her to pursue acting as a career and Poupaud crediting Mastroianni for his friendship with her ex-husband Benjamin Biolay.

Filmography

As actor

As filmmaker

Bibliography
Melvil Poupaud, Quel est Mon noM, Paris, Éditions Stock, coll. « La Bleue », 7 septembre 2011, 288 p.

Other awards 
 1998: Berlin International Film Festival - Shooting Stars Award

References

External links

 
 Melvil Poupaud at Bonus Tracks Records

1973 births
Living people
French male film actors
French male television actors
Male actors from Paris
20th-century French male actors
21st-century French male actors
French film directors
French male screenwriters
French screenwriters
French film editors
French cinematographers
French composers
French male composers
French male non-fiction writers